Blue is an unincorporated community in Tyler County, West Virginia, United States. Its post office  is closed in 1935.

References 

Unincorporated communities in West Virginia
Unincorporated communities in Tyler County, West Virginia